Ernest Casimir-Lambert (19 June 1897 – 24 April 1931) was a Belgian bobsledder. He competed in the four-man event at the 1928 Winter Olympics.

References

1897 births
1931 deaths
Belgian male bobsledders
Olympic bobsledders of Belgium
Bobsledders at the 1928 Winter Olympics
Sportspeople from Brussels